Bald Mountain Hot Springs in Ketchum, Idaho was a historic resort.  Located at Main and 1st St. in Ketchum, the complex was listed on the National Register of Historic Places in 1982.  In 2003, plans had been approved for a new 80-room hotel complex on the site.

The original complex was built as the Bald Mountain Hot Springs Motel in 1929 by Carl E. Brandt, manager of the J.C. Penney store in Hailey, Idaho, who had bought a different, decrepit hot spring resort enterprise northwest of Ketchum in 1827.  Rather than fixing that up, he moved the hot water to the new resort location on Main Street in Ketchum.  The resort included Rustic-style architecture and work by architects Tourtellotte & Hummel.  It included the C. E. Brandt Residence, tourist cabins, and the natatorium where people swam in hot springs water piped in from three miles away.

In 2003, three of the historic structures had been moved to a hunting club location near Hagerman, Idaho.

References

Hotel buildings on the National Register of Historic Places in Idaho
Hotel buildings completed in 1929
Buildings and structures in Blaine County, Idaho
National Register of Historic Places in Blaine County, Idaho